Shahin Khadakerim oglu Diniyev (born 12 July 1966), is an Azerbaijani football manager.

Life and career
Diniyev played football as a midfielder. His club career included spells in the USSR, and later Russia, and finally back to Azerbaijan, where he ended his career with Dynamo Baku. He competed 16 times for the Azerbaijani national team, gaining no international caps with the USSR before independence. Following a period as a youth coach, Diniyev moved into club management, first with FK Qarabağ and then Kapaz PFC. Diniyev's sons are also professional footballers with Karim currently playing for Zira, and Joshgun for Sabah.

Azerbaijan national team career

In November 2005, he impressed the AFFA sufficiently to be awarded with the national team job, promising to restructure the squad with an emphasis on youth and to help turn Azerbaijan into a credible force within UEFA competition. Replacing Vagif Sadygov, Diniyev's first game in charge was a friendly against Ukraine in Baku at the Tofig Bakhramov Stadium; the result was 0-0, a minor success against stronger opposition.

In further friendlies, a shock 1–1 draw against Turkey and another 0–0 draw against Moldova followed. Diniyev was soon to witness his first defeat as Azerbaijan coach: in August 2006 he watched his team succumb to a 6–0 defeat against Ukraine, this time in Kyiv. This game was the final friendly match before qualification for the 2008 UEFA European Football Championship began. (See Azerbaijan national football team.)

Under Diniyev, the Azerbaijan squad has given debuts to not only young players but also some naturalised foreigners, such as Leandro Gomes of FC Baku, who was born in Brazil.

Career statistics

International

Statistics accurate as of 20 October 2015

Managerial

Notes and references

External links
Azerbaycan Futbol Federasiyaları Assosiasiyası - English language version also available

1966 births
Living people
People from Beylagan District
Soviet footballers
Azerbaijani footballers
Azerbaijan international footballers
Azerbaijani expatriate footballers
FK Energetik players
FC Fakel Voronezh players
Liga Leumit players
Hapoel Tayibe F.C. players
Beitar Tel Aviv F.C. players
Expatriate footballers in Israel
Azerbaijan national football team managers
Azerbaijani expatriate football managers
Azerbaijani football managers
FC Akhmat Grozny managers
Russian Premier League managers
Expatriate football managers in Russia
Qarabağ FK managers
Association football midfielders
FC Akhmat Grozny players
Azerbaijani expatriate sportspeople in Israel
Ravan Baku FK managers